The 1995–96 Lebanese Premier League season was the 36th season of the Lebanese Premier League, the top Lebanese professional league for association football clubs in the country, established in 1934.

Shabab Sahel and Riada Wal Adab joined as the promoted clubs from the 1994–95 Lebanese Second Division. They replaced Salam Zgharta and Ahli Saida who were relegated to the 1995–96 Lebanese Second Division. Ansar, the defending champions, won their eighth consecutive—and overall—Lebanese Premier League title.

League table

Top goalscorers

References

External links
RSSSF

Leb
1995–96 in Lebanese football
Lebanese Premier League seasons